Stewarton Academy is a co-educational, non-demonational secondary school in the town of Stewarton, East Ayrshire, Scotland. The current Head Teacher of Stewarton Academy is Mr J. Stuart.

The schools academic performance in terms of examination results is above the national average in Scotland. In 2022, it ranked as the 190th best performing state school in Scotland, an increase from its position in 2021 where it was ranked as the 200th best performing Scottish secondary school. As a result, Stewart Academy is regarded as the best performing secondary school in East Ayrshire.

History and catchment area

Stewarton Academy serves a rural part of East Ayrshire including Stewarton, Dunlop and Kilmaurs. Currently, Stewarton Academy has four associated primary schools; Dunlop Primary School, Kilmaurs Primary School, Nether Robertland Primary School and Lainshaw Primary School.

In November 2020, the school was affected by an outbreak of COVID-19. As a result, the school was deep cleaned prior to pupils and staff returning.

Pupils at Stewarton Academy won the Readers Cup Challenge in 2016 against other local schools.

Stewarton Academy provides a training programme to pupils interested in a career within the construction industry. This initiative has been funded and supported by local construction firm GRAHAM.

2014 inspection

In 2014, Education Scotland inspected the school and found major strengths of the educational provision provided for young people, with the overall inspection being graded as "very good". Points raised by Education Scotland pointed to:

 "polite, friendly and well-behaved young people, who enjoy their learning in a supportive and very caring environment"
 "the strong leadership of the new acting headteacher, senior management and the active contribution of staff to the very positive climate for learning"
 "the impressive achievements of young people in a wide range of activities across the school"
 "the school’s approaches to improving its work through very effective analysis of pupil data and the use of self evaluation"
 "a wide range of partnerships which enhance learners’ experiences"

Upgrade investments

In 2017, East Ayrshire Council pledged £13.2 million in investment towards Stewarton Academy in order to provide vital upgrades and repairs to the current school estate.

Over the next six years, Stewarton Academy will see full refurbishment of the existing building, improved sports facilities and the construction of a new extension. Funding has been allocated by East Ayrshire Council for:

 £7 million for the extension
 £2 million to upgrade the sports facilities
 £4 million to improve heating, electrical systems, ventilation systems, roofing, accessibility adaptations and hospitality and catering facilities
 £2.5 million for additional support needs provision

See also
 List of schools in Scotland

References 

Stewarton
Secondary schools in East Ayrshire